Michael Patrick Kelly (May 6, 1942 – December 7, 2016) was a Republican member of the Alaska House of Representatives, representing the 7th District from 2005 until 2011.  In the 26th Alaska State Legislature, he served on the Finance Committee, chairing the Corrections and the Natural Resources Finance Subcommittee. He also served on the Fish & Game Finance Subcommittee.

Prior to politics
Mike Kelly was born on May 6, 1942 in Tacoma, Washington, the oldest of seven children of Halford "Hal" and Helen Kelly. Hal Kelly moved to Fairbanks, Alaska in late 1947; his family moved to Fairbanks the following year. Mike Kelly graduated from Monroe High School in 1960.

Kelly retired as the President and CEO of GVEA in 2000, and was working as a commuter airline pilot for Tanana Air Service at the time of his election to the State House.  He served a single term on the University of Alaska Board of Regents, from 1991 to 1999, serving as president of the board from 1996 to 1998.

Political career
Kelly is the oldest brother of Pete Kelly, who represented Fairbanks in the Alaska House from 1995 to 1999, and the Alaska Senate from 1999 to 2003. Mike Kelly ran for an open House seat in 2004, defeating a primary opponent and 3 opponents on the general election ballot. Most of his time in office was spent dealing with solutions to problems brought on by the public employee retirement system in Alaska and the potential for future budget problems due to unfunded liabilities. This angered the old-timer and conservative constituencies who originally voted for him, as he mainly talked about building large-scale development projects. The solution he achieved, which would have resulted in lesser benefits for newer public employees than the ones who came before, also angered the public employee sector. They began to target Kelly for defeat.

2008 campaign
In 2008, Kelly faced two primary challengers. He defeated Schaeffer Cox, a 24-year-old carpenter who would later become better known for his involvement in the militia movement, by an approximately 51 to 36 percent margin. In the general election, he was re-elected by only 4 votes against Karl Kassel, who had recently retired as head of parks and recreation for the Fairbanks North Star Borough.

2010 campaign
In 2010, he was defeated for reelection by Bob Miller, a former television anchor. Political action committees were formed specifically to oppose Kelly. Advertisements pointing out his actions on the public employee retirement issue, presented in contrast with his own retirement package from Golden Valley Electric Association, were a constant presence during the 2010 campaign season.

Personal life and death
Kelly and his wife Cherie had five children, Roxanne, Shannon, Erin, Cecilia and James, as well as 12 grandchildren. He graduated from Monroe High School in 1960, attended Seattle University from 1960–1961, and received his Bachelor of Business Administration degree from the University of Alaska in 1966.

Kelly was killed in the crash of an American Champion Citabria, which was being piloted by Kelly, on Fort Wainwright near Fairbanks, Alaska on December 7, 2016.

References

External links
 Alaska State House Majority Site
 Alaska State Legislature Biography
 Project Vote Smart profile
 Mike Kelly at 100 Years of Alaska's Legislature

1942 births
2016 deaths
Aviators killed in aviation accidents or incidents in the United States
Businesspeople from Fairbanks, Alaska
Republican Party members of the Alaska House of Representatives
Politicians from Fairbanks, Alaska
Seattle University alumni
University of Alaska Fairbanks alumni
University of Alaska regents
Politicians from Tacoma, Washington
Accidental deaths in Alaska
21st-century American politicians
Commercial aviators
Victims of aviation accidents or incidents in 2016
20th-century American businesspeople